Swords of Steel is a children's historical novel by Elsie Singmaster. Set before and during the American Civil War, it tells of the childhood and coming of age of a boy from the North and his involvement with the war. The novel, illustrated by David Hendrickson, was first published in 1933 and was a Newbery Honor recipient in 1934.

Plot summary
In 1859 a 12-year-old John Deane lives in Gettysburg, Pennsylvania with his family. He is friends with Nicholas, a black servant, with whom he is training a colt. He is devastated when Nicholas is kidnapped by slave catchers and sent to the South to be sold. He learns that his father is a conductor on the Underground Railroad, and he visits Harper's Ferry where he witnesses John Brown's raid. When the war reaches Pennsylvania, his house is seized by the Confederates, and he is locked in the cellar. However, he is helped by the troop's cook, his old friend Nicholas. Later he joins the Union Army and sees the final events of the war.

References

1933 American novels
Children's historical novels
American children's novels
Newbery Honor-winning works
Novels set in Pennsylvania
Novels set during the American Civil War
Fiction set in 1859
Novels about American slavery
1933 children's books